Kim Kuusi (born 28 December 1947, in Helsinki) is a Finnish composer best known for his advertising jingles.

Kuusi studied at the Helsinki School of Economics, also teaching there in 1975. Alongside studying, Kuusi had been involved in the creation of Ryhmäteatteri as its composer and musician from 1969 to 1973. At the same time, he also performed in Pihasoittajat, for whom he wrote, among other things, the Finnish Eurovision entry in 1975, Old man fiddle.

References

External links 
 Armeija marssii Pohjantähden alla (Kauppalehti.fi) 
 

1947 births
Living people
Musicians from Helsinki
Jingle composers